Statherotis discana, the litchi leafroller, is a moth of the family Tortricidae. It is found in Thailand, Taiwan, Japan, the Philippines, India, Java, the Solomon Islands, the Moluccas and New Guinea.

The wingspan is 14–16 mm. The forewings are deep purple or fuscous purple, marbled with slaty grey.

The larvae feed on Litchi chinensis and Nephelium lappaceum. They feed on the leaves of the host plant, rolling the leaf while feeding.

References

Moths described in 1875
Olethreutini
Moths of Japan
Taxa named by Alois Friedrich Rogenhofer